Acropora derawanensis is a species of acroporid coral found in the eastern Indian Ocean and the west central Pacific Ocean. It is particularly susceptible to coral bleaching, disease, and crown-of-thorns starfish predation.

Description
Acropora derawanensis can grow to a metre or so in diameter. It forms upright (or occasionally prostrate) bush-like colonies of tangled slender branches. The axial corallites are elongated and tubular, while the radial corallites are smaller, also tubular or pocket-shaped, and have angular edges. This coral is usually reddish-brown, with contrasting white or blueish axial corallites.

Distribution and habitat
Acropora derawanensis is native to the eastern Indian Ocean and the western central Pacific Ocean, its range extending from Malaysia and Indonesia to the Philippines, northern Australia and Papua New Guinea.

Status
The reefs on which Acropora derawanensis lives are under threat from global warming, increased ocean acidification and reef destruction. It is a generally uncommon species of coral and is particularly susceptible to bleaching and coral diseases. The International Union for Conservation of Nature has assessed its conservation status as being "vulnerable", considering that 39% of the colonies may be lost in the next thirty years (three generation lengths).

References

Acropora
Cnidarians of the Pacific Ocean
Cnidarians of the Indian Ocean
Marine fauna of Asia
Marine fauna of Oceania
Marine fauna of Southeast Asia
Anthozoa of Australia
Vulnerable fauna of Asia
Vulnerable fauna of Oceania
Animals described in 1997